Candelariella complanata is a species of squamulose (scaley) and saxicolous (rock-dwelling) lichen in the family Candelariaceae. Found in southwestern North America, it was formally described as a new species in 2007 by Swedish lichenologist Martin Westberg. The thallus of the lichen is complanate (smooth) as a result of its flattened and peltate (like a shield or plate attached on the lower surface) squamules. This gives it a distinct appearance that is referenced in the specific epithet complanata. The geographic range of Candelariella complanata includes Baja California, Coahuila, Sinaloa, and Sonora, north to southern Arizona, Texas, and New Mexico. It prefers to grow on siliceous rock in open montane habitats to elevations of at least .

References

complanata
Lichen species
Lichens described in 2007
Lichens of Mexico
Lichens of the Southwestern United States
Fungi without expected TNC conservation status
Lichens of the South-Central United States